Paul Chandrashekar Valthaty  (born on 7 December 1983) is a former Indian cricketer who played for Kings XI Punjab and Rajasthan Royals in the Indian Premier League & for India in the 2002 ICC Under 19 Cricket World Cup. He had to retire from the sport after he suffered an eye injury. He is known for his knock of 120 runs in 63 balls against Chennai Super Kings.

Early years and personal life
Valthaty was born and raised in the Borivali district of Mumbai. His family originally hails from Andhra Pradesh.

Valthaty was trained in Dilip Vengsarkar academy in Mumbai. He was then recommended by Vengsarkar to Andhra Cricket Association (ACA) president Mr. Chamundeswarnath.

Career

Early domestic career
Valthaty had a nondescript career till then, since making his way up the levels of age group cricket in Mumbai during the late 1990s. He made India's Under-19 squad to the 2002 World Cup in New Zealand with the likes of Irfan Pathan and Parthiv Patel where an injury to his eye in the game against Bangladesh halted his development. He couldn't make the breakthrough into senior cricket for years, and got just one opportunity for Mumbai, a one-dayer in 2006. There was no high-profile cricket for him for another few years, till Rajasthan Royals punted on him in the 2009 season, where he played a couple of matches. That earned him a place in Mumbai's Twenty20 side, and he turned in a few powerful performances for them, which led to a contract with Kings XI Punjab in 2011.

Indian Premier League
Paul Valthaty was picked by Kings XI Punjab as a backup to expensive international buys at a player auction in January. He was the opening batsmen for Kings XI Punjab, and had an outstanding game in the 2011 Indian Premier League against the reigning champions Chennai Super Kings. Valthaty raced to 120 not out in 63 balls as the Kings XI Punjab chased down a 189-run target with six wickets and five balls to spare at Mohali. It was the first hundred of IPL 2011 and 13th overall and this century is his first fastest century. It remains the 11th highest IPL score ever, after, Chris Gayle's 175* & 128, Brendon McCullum's 158*, AB de Villiers's 133*,129*,
Quinton de Kock's 140* and K. L. Rahul's 132*, Murali Vijay's 127, Rishabh Pant's 128* and Virender Sehwag's 122. It is also the highest individual score by a batsman in the IPL at the Inderjit Singh Bindra Stadium. In his next game Paul scored 75 of 47 deliveries hitting 5 sixes and 8 fours after achieving the best bowling figures for any Kings XI Punjab bowler with 4 for 29. His all round performance resulted in a big win for his team. He played a pacey innings in his next match scoring 46 off just 31 deliveries with three classic sixes. With his initial blitzkrieg, the team crossed the fifty in just three overs, a record in IPL history which was later beaten by the Royal Challengers Bangalore in their second match against the Kochi Tuskers Kerala in the same season. He was retained by Kings Xi Punjab for 2012 and 2013 seasons. He failed in both the seasons and slowly faded away from the scene.

Career with Air India 
Paul Valthaty, following his IPL fade-out, now plays for his employers Air India. He received the job on a sports quota and is required to only practice and play games under the terms of his employer.

Mumbai T20 League 
In March 2018, Mumbai South Central acquired Paul Valthaty for ₹50,000 in the six-franchise Mumbai T20 League. He fell under the Developmental Players bracket and was thus given the minimum salary.

References

Indian cricketers
1983 births
Living people
People from Kurnool district
Mumbai cricketers
Himachal Pradesh cricketers
India Blue cricketers
Rajasthan Royals cricketers
Punjab Kings cricketers